SelfCAD is an online computer-aided design software for 3D modeling and 3D printing, released in 2016. It is browser-based and cloud-based. SelfCAD is a polygon mesh based design program.

While SelfCAD is suitable for the everyday user, of all ages, it has been specifically designed for students and the classroom setting. Despite this, one of SelfCAD's unique attributes is its real-world authenticity. In other words, the step up from SelfCAD to higher level engineering design programs is easier for those with SelfCAD experience.

History

SelfCAD was founded in New York City in 2015 by Aaron Breuer, its CEO. He designed the namesake software and launched it in 2016.

Since 2016, SelfCAD has been consistently updated and enhanced with new features. In June 2017, SelfCAD partnered with MyMiniFactory for a direct connection to its 3D model repository. As of November 2017, the software is used in over 100 schools  and had a 3D model catalogue of 25,000 objects.

Update 2.9 added Animation among other important features such as Loft and Revolve. Update 2.9.1  released in February 2020 added Multiple Viewports and Backface Culling.

For future updates, SelfCAD promises to implement Rendering among other features.

SelfCAD organized contests through MyMiniFactory where the participants won prizes for their 3D models made in SelfCAD. The last contest was held in December 2019. The first prize was $500.

Features

SelfCAD is an online CAD Software as a Service that allows users to model, sculpt and slice for 3D design and 3D printing. As it is browser-based, no downloads are required. Work can be saved in the cloud, but there is also an offline mode.

The software has a shallow learning curve and can be self-taught in five hours. It is supported on Windows 7, 8 and 10, Mac and Linux with browser support for Chrome, Firefox and Safari.

SelfCAD is said to be easy to operate and user-friendly. The software features numerous creation and modification tools, as well as inbuilt automatic shape, screw, nut, spiral and image generators. Another notable feature is an inbuilt slicing tool. In addition to partnering with 
MyMiniFactory to provide a database of already completed 3D printable designs, SelfCAD has a comprehensive library of objects and parts. The software also boasts the ability to import models in STL and OBJ format from other 3D design programs.

Given that SelfCAD is designed for students and use in the classroom setting, the company places more emphasis on roll-out in the education sector. For example, according to their webpage, their so-called 'SelfCAD for Education' program offers additional features and support for schools and educators. Some of these features include: access to their special online storage database, additional safety and security measures, and additional support for teachers.
To export designs to stl a paid subscription is required.

References

External links 

Computer-aided design software
Software companies based in New York City
American companies established in 2015
Software companies of the United States
2015 establishments in New York City
Software companies established in 2015
Business services companies established in 2015